Diwan-e-Ghalib is a famous poetry book written by the famous Persian and Urdu poet Mirza Asadullah Khan Ghalib. It is a collection of the ghazals of Ghalib. Though it does not include all of his ghazals as he was too choosy to include them all, still in many other copies of the Diwan Urdu scholars have tried to collect all of his precious works. Several editions of the Diwan exist such as the Nuskha-e Nizami, Nuskha-e Arshi by Imtiaz Ali 'Arshi', Nuskha-e Hamidiya (Bhopal), Nuskha az Ghulam rasool Mehr.

Synopsis
Diwan-e-Ghalib includes around 200 ghazals and the original copy had fewer ghazals than this. The researchers included other ghazals, as and when found, after the death of Ghalib. The ghazals are written in Rekhta the then spoken Urdu language.

Notes

External links
 Read Diwan-e-Ghalib

Indian poetry collections
Poetry by Mirza Ghalib
Urdu-language poetry
Persian poetry